Arab American Vehicles is an Egyptian automobile manufacturer based in Cairo, Egypt.

The company manufactures various vehicles under license from Daimler AG, Kia, Stellantis and Toyota, having begun as a joint venture in 1977 between the Arab Organization for Industrialization and American Motors Corporation to assemble AMC Jeeps. On 14 December 1978, production began of vehicles for both military and civilian use.
Following Chrysler's acquisition of AMC in 1987 Chrysler Group LLC eventually gained 49% ownership of the company. Their current lineup consists of the Jeep Cherokee and the open-top Wrangler-based Jeep AAV TJL.

Currently assembled 

 Toyota

References

 fas.org - Arab American Vehicle (AAV) Special Weapons Facilities - Egypt

External links

Defence companies of Egypt
Manufacturing companies based in Cairo
Car manufacturers of Egypt